8/12 Binay Badal Dinesh is a 2022 Bengali-language historical drama film directed by Arun Roy, produced by Kan Singh Sodha based on the historical attack on Writers' Building by three Bengal Volunteers in 1930. The film was released on 26 January 2022 under the banner of KSS Productions and Entertainment.

Plot
The plot is based on the life and contribution of Binoy, Badal and Dinesh, revolutionary trio. On 8 December 1930 they entered into the Writers' Building, British India Secretariat of Bengal at B. B. D. Bagh to assassinate the infamous British Inspector General N.S. Simpson.

Cast

Soundtrack

The soundtrack album is composed And Written by Soumya Rit

Reception
In their review Cinestaan gave the film three stars from five, praising the direction, writing, and cinematic finesse while criticising the overpowering heavy metal soundtrack and a few over-the top performances. The reviewer considered: "Gopi Bhagat’s experienced camerawork and editor Sanglap Bhowmick’s fine trimming of the scenes make 8/12 one of the better Bengali period films made in recent times." Jani News gave the film a positive review, praising the direction, acting and cinematography. The reviewer stated: "The way director Arun Roy presents the forty minutes of armed struggle in a very restrained manner, with beautiful choreography in just 12/13 minutes, has probably never been seen in a Bengali film before." Ananda Bazaar also gave a positive review, praising the acting and direction while criticising the music and pacing of the story.

References

External links 
 

2022 drama films
2022 films
Bengali-language Indian films
Indian biographical films
Films set in the Indian independence movement
Indian films based on actual events
Indian historical drama films